Aayiram Janmangal is a 1976 Indian Malayalam film, directed by P. N. Sundaram and produced by Pavamani. The film stars Prem Nazir, K. R. Vijaya, Sukumari and T. R. Omana in the lead roles. The film has musical score by M. S. Viswanathan. 
 The movie is a remake of the 1974 Tamil movie Dheerga Sumangali.

Cast
 
Prem Nazir as Madhavan Nair 
K. R. Vijaya as Lakshmi 
K. P. Ummer as Lawyer Sukumaran 
Sukumari as Leela Sukumaran 
T. R. Omana as Madhavan Nair's Aunty 
Sudheer as Babu 
Bahadoor as Krishnan 
Junior Balayya as Kumar 
Lakshmisree as Shobha 
Veeran as Lakshmi's Father 
Meena as Lakshmi's Stepmother 
Sripriya as Mallika 
Kunchan as Mohandas
Master Raghu as Rajan's Childhood 
Master Sekhar as Rajan 
Master Sunil as Babu's Childhood 
Baby Babitha as Shobha's Childhood 
Master Anil as Kumar's Childhood

Soundtrack
The music was composed by M. S. Viswanathan.

References

External links
  
 

1976 films
1970s Malayalam-language films
Malayalam remakes of Tamil films